Vitovlje may refer to:
 Vitovlje, Nova Gorica, in western Slovenia
 Vitovlje, Travnik, in central Bosnia
 Vitovlje Malo, a village in Dobretići municipality, Central Bosnia Canton, Bosnia and Herzegovina